El Sentinel is the name of two Spanish language newspapers in Florida, both owned by the Tribune Company of Chicago.
 El Sentinel del Sur de la Florida, a weekly based in Fort Lauderdale that serves the South Florida region
 El Sentinel (Orlando), a weekly based in Orlando, Florida that serves the Central Florida region